James Chambers, born 14 February 1987 in Dublin, is an Irish former professional footballer who played for Shelbourne, Waterford United, Drogheda United, Shamrock Rovers (2 spells) and St Patrick's Athletic (2 spells) in Ireland, Solihull Moors in England, Hamilton Academical in Scotland and Bethlehem Steel in the United States.

Club career

Shelbourne
James Chambers played for Shelbourne since he was 11 years of age. He has also been capped for Ireland at every level from 15's right up to 23's. He started out with the schoolboy teams and made his breakthrough into the first team during the 2004 season, at the age of 17, including being part of the Shelbourne squad during their successful 2004 European campaign. He did not make his first official first team appearance for Shelbourne until 15 August 2005 when he made his League of Ireland debut coming on as a 2nd half substitute during a 1–0 defeat to Cork City at Turner's Cross. To aid James with his development and to gain valuable experience, he was loaned out to Waterford United for the 2006 season and instantly became a regular in their starting XI. On 24 February 2007, Chambers received a call up to the Republic of Ireland U21 squad by manager Don Givens.

Chambers returned to Shelbourne for the 2007 season but he was entering upon a very unfamiliar environment at the Tolka Park club. Shelbourne were now in financial meltdown and were uncertain over their participation for the 2007 season. After the club was demoted to the First Division, he made the decision to stay at Shels despite their demotion and keen interest in him from numerous Premier Division clubs. As only one of two first team players retained by Shelbourne for the 2007 season, Chambers' talents were now of great importance to Shelbourne and he has become one of the first names on the Shels teamsheet due to many impressive performances. He scored his first senior goal for Shelbourne with a delightful equaliser in a 1–1 draw with Monaghan United at Tolka Park on 13 April 2007.

Move to Britain
Chambers departed Shelbourne after 10 years at the end of the 2008 season to move to Britain. He made a total of 73 league and cup appearances for Shelbourne scoring 8 times. He went on trial at Walsall but was ineligible to play matches so he joined Blue Square Conference North side Solihull Moors on 16 January 2009 to get game time. Chambers' stay at Solihull Moors would be brief as he returned to Ireland in March 2009 to join Drogheda United.

Return to Ireland
He made his competitive Drogheda debut on 13 March 2009 in 0–0 draw against Bray Wanderers at United Park. Chambers went on an amazing scoring streak in the 2009 season. He scored nine goals, including the all-important opener against Bray Wanderers in the relegation play-off, a match which finished 2–0 to Drogheda United. Following his impressive season at Drogheda United, Chambers joined Shamrock Rovers in November 2009. In his first season with 'The Hoops', Chambers scored an impressive 11 league goals and won his first League of Ireland winners medal after Shamrock Rovers won the 2010 Premier Division on the final night of the season.

Hamilton Academical
He moved to Scottish Premier League team Hamilton Academical on 25 January 2011 Hamilton Academical FC. Chambers showed spells of his League of Ireland form whilst playing in the SPL but Hamilton were relegated into the First Division but he left the club after a year.

St Patrick's Athletic
Chambers was signed by Liam Buckley for St Patrick's Athletic in January 2012. Chambers impressed the Pats fans with his superb passing and found himself playing in a midfield role that saw him be the key to his sides attacks beginning. He picked up the RTÉ man of the match award for his brilliant display including the assist for the opening goal by Christy Forrester against his old club and Dublin rivals Shamrock Rovers after the Saints ran riot and won 5–1 in a famous night. Chambers set up Christy Fagan's opener against U.C.D after an excellent slipped ball through the defence. Unfortunately Chambers' excellent form for Pats was interrupted for 2 months after he picked up an injury away to Sligo Rovers. Chambers returned from the bench against Bohemians in fine form and changes the game for Pats to win 2–1. Chambers played in all of the Saints games of their Europa League campaign, where they knocked out Íþróttabandalag Vestmannaeyja from Iceland and NK Široki Brijeg from Bosnia and Herzegovina before being knocked out by German giants Hannover 96 in front of 25,000 people at the AWD-Arena. He played in the 2012 FAI Cup Final at the Aviva Stadium, as Pats lost 3–2 after extra time to Derry City. Chambers was voted into the 2012 PFAI Team of the Year by his fellow League of Ireland players, for an excellent season.

Season Back at Rovers
Chambers signed again for The Hoops in November 2012. He won the 2013 League Cup, the 2013 Setanta Cup and the 2013 Leinster Senior Cup (scoring in a 1–0 win over St Pat's in the final), however the season was overall a disappointing one for Chambers as Rovers finished fifth, with his old side Pats winning the league, and he left at the end of the season.

Return to Pats
Chambers signed back for champions St Patrick's Athletic for the 2014 season. Week after week he impressed fans, putting in a string of man of the match performances week in week out and retained his place in the midfield for most of the season amidst competition for places from Keith Fahey, Killian Brennan, Greg Bolger and Lee Lynch. The Saints disappointingly only finished third in the league but the season remained a success with third place earning a Europa League spot for next season, winning the 2014 FAI President's Cup, the 2014 Leinster Senior Cup and most impressively, winning the 2014 FAI Cup to end a 53-year drought for the club since last winning the competition. He signed a new contract for the 2015 season in January 2015. On 19 September 2015 Pats won the 2015 League of Ireland Cup against Galway United, with Chambers scoring his penalty in a penalty shoot-out win after a 0–0 draw at Eamonn Deacy Park. Chambers had a very impressive season individually in a poor season for the team. He scored 5 goals in all competitions, 3 of them coming direct from freekicks. He was voted at the St Patrick's Athletic Player of the season for 2015 by the club's supporters for his excellent performances. Chambers was also voted into the PFAI Team of the Year by his fellow League of Ireland players.

Bethlehem Steel

Chambers signed for Bethlehem Steel of United Soccer League on 28 January 2016.

Chambers retired after the end of the club's 2019 season.

International career
Chambers made his Republic of Ireland Under 21 debut at the Madeira tournament in Portugal in February 2007. He made 3 appearances for the Irish side in the tournament. In May 2010, Chambers made his Republic of Ireland Under 23 debut against England C in the 2009-11 International Challenge Trophy at the Waterford Regional Sports Centre.

Career statistics

Honours

Club
League of Ireland (1):
 Shamrock Rovers – 2010
FAI Cup (1):
 St Patrick's Athletic – 2014
League of Ireland Cup (2):
 Shamrock Rovers – 2013
 St Patrick's Athletic – 2015
Setanta Sports Cup (1):
 Shamrock Rovers – 2013
FAI President's Cup (1):
 St Patrick's Athletic – 2014
Leinster Senior Cup (2):
 Shamrock Rovers – 2013
 St Patrick's Athletic – 2014

Individual
PFAI Team of the Year (2): 2012, 2015
St Patrick's Athletic Player of the Year (1): 2015

References

External links
 
 James Chambers' profile at www.shelbournefc.com

Living people
1987 births
Association footballers from Dublin (city)
Association football midfielders
Republic of Ireland association footballers
Republic of Ireland expatriate association footballers
Republic of Ireland under-21 international footballers
Republic of Ireland youth international footballers
League of Ireland players
National League (English football) players
Scottish Premier League players
Scottish Football League players
Shelbourne F.C. players
Waterford F.C. players
Solihull Moors F.C. players
Drogheda United F.C. players
Shamrock Rovers F.C. players
Hamilton Academical F.C. players
St Patrick's Athletic F.C. players
Philadelphia Union II players
Republic of Ireland under-23 international footballers
Expatriate soccer players in the United States